Cheonan Station is the main train station in central Cheonan, South Korea, and the junction of the Gyeongbu and Janghang Lines.  It has also been served by Seoul Subway Line 1 since 2005.

Gallery

References

External links
 Station information from Korail

Metro stations in Cheonan
Seoul Metropolitan Subway stations
Railway stations in South Chungcheong Province
Railway stations in Korea opened in 1905